Dezső Jakab (4 November 1864 – 5 August 1932) was a Hungarian architect of Jewish heritage.

Life 
He received his degree in architecture from the Budapest University of Technology. At the time of the millennial exhibition, the Ministry of Agriculture designed the technical exhibition buildings.

In his earlier buildings he is a follower of the Hungarian style started by Ödön Lechner, later he draws from the sources of the Baroque and more recently the French Renaissance in his works designed in a modern spirit. In recent years he has worked in association with architect Aladár Sós. He gave several lectures on the journey of European study at the Hungarian Association of Engineers and Architects, where he won the Grand Gold Medal and the Silver Medal for his work.

Works 

With the architect Márcell Komor, he designed the buildings listed below:
 The Muranian Palace of King Ferdinand of Bulgaria; 
 Subotica City Hall and Palic Bath;
 Târgu Mureș City Hall (now the Administrative Palace) and Palace of Culture;
 consolation in Bratislava and Oradea;
 Deva Art Theatre and the Budapest Folk Opera (using the plans of Géza Márkus);
 the synagogue of Subotica; 
 the synagogue of Marcali;
 the headquarters of the Workers' Insurance Fund in Budapest;
 Liget-, Park- and most recently the Svábhegy sanatoriums;
 many banks, villas, hospital buildings in Budapest and in the countryside.

Sources 
 Magyar zsidó lexikon. Szerk. Ujvári Péter. Budapest: Magyar Zsidó Lexikon. 1929. 413. o.

Another literature 
 Várallyay Réka: Komor Marcell és Jakab Dezső, (Holnap Kiadó, Budapest, 2006

Hungarian architects
Hungarian Jews
1864 births
1932 deaths